S.J. (Simone) Kennedy-Doornbos (born 19 December 1970 in Kampen) is a Dutch politician of the ChristianUnion (ChristenUnie). She is also a tour operator and former translator.

Biography

Local political activities 
Kennedy-Doornbos has been a member of the municipal council of Amersfoort since April 2006, succeeding Hans van Daalen who had become an alderman. In January 2011 she succeeded Menno Tigelaar as ChristianUnion fraction leader, who had also been chosen as an alderman. She focuses on matters of finance, economics, culture, mass media, tourism and the Bergkwartier, Leusderkwartier, Liendert and Rustenburg quarters.

In the past she was list puller for the Reformed Political League (Gereformeerd Politiek Verbond) in the municipal election of 1994 of the city of Amsterdam.

National political activities 
She has been a member of the trustee of the ChristianUnion think tank since 2004 and was participating in the ChristianUnion election manifesto committee for the general election of 2006 and the general election of 2010. In May 2011 she was a high-ranked candidate for the Senate election, but just missed a seat.

Other activities 
Kennedy-Doornbos studied biology at the University of Amsterdam. From 1994 to 2003 she lived in the United States, where she worked at an American travel agency called Eurotrail and as a translator at the A. C. Van Raalte Institute of Hope College. Since her return to the Netherlands she is working on a freelance basis for Eurotrail.

Personal life 
She is married to American historian James Kennedy, a Dutch history professor at the University of Utrecht, and like her husband belongs to the Reformed Churches in the Netherlands (Liberated).

Awards 
 Dutch councillor of the year 2009

References 
  Parlement.com biography

1970 births
Living people
Christian Union (Netherlands) politicians
21st-century Dutch politicians
Dutch biologists
Dutch expatriates in the United States
Dutch translators
Municipal councillors of Amersfoort
People from Amersfoort
People from Kampen, Overijssel
Reformed Churches (Liberated) Christians from the Netherlands
Reformed Political League politicians
University of Amsterdam alumni
21st-century Dutch women politicians
21st-century translators